有賀 is a Japanese surname, read as either Ariga or Aruga. Notable people with the surname include:

, Japanese speed skater
Katsuhiko Ariga (born 1962), Japanese chemist
Kosaku Aruga, or less often by the alternate reading Kosaku Ariga, captain in the Imperial Japanese Navy.

Japanese-language surnames